Kompienga is one of the 45 provinces of Burkina Faso, located in its Est Region.

The capital of Kompienga is Pama. The province also borders the country of Togo.  The Kompienga Dam located in the province is the country's first hydro-electric dam and is responsible for much of Ouagadougou's electricity supply.

Departments

See also
 West Africa

References

 
Provinces of Burkina Faso